Hypericum tenuifolium, known as Atlantic St. John's-wort and sandhill St. John's-wort, is a species of flowering plant in the St. John's wort family, Hypericaceae. It is native to the Southeastern United States.

Description
The flowerheads are narrowly cylindric, producing 1-7 flowers. Each flower is  broad with 5 sepals, 5 bright yellow petals, and 50-90 stamens. The ovaries are three-parted, forming cylindric capsule fruits. It flowers in the summer, typically June through September, but sometimes as late as December.

Distribution and habitat
Hypericum tenuifolium occurs in the Atlantic coastal plain in the southeastern United States, in Alabama, Florida, Georgia, North Carolina, and South Carolina. Its habitat includes dry, open, sandy areas such as pine flatwoods, pine savannas, and sandhills.

References

tenuifolium
Flora of North America